Ella Bucio Dovali (born 20 August 1997) is a Mexican traceur.

Biography
In her youth, Bucio trained in artistic gymnastics and she later switched to parkour in 2016. In May 2022, at the World Cup in Montpellier, Bucio won gold in freestyle and bronze in speed. In September 2022 at the World Cup in Sofia, she took her second World Cup victory in freestyle.

In October 2022, at the Parkour World Championships in Tokyo, Bucio took the women's first gold in freestyle category in the first edition of the championship.

References

1997 births
Living people
Sportspeople from Mexico City
Mexican sportswomen
Traceurs